The Syntactic Phenomena of English is a book that describes syntax in the English language by James D. McCawley.

References

Reviews 

 
 

1988 non-fiction books
English grammar books
University of Chicago Press books